Brahman Wadi is a village in India, situated in Mawal taluka of Pune district in the state of Maharashtra.

Administration
The village is administrated by a sarpanch, an elected representative who leads a gram panchayat. At the time of the 2011 Census of India, the gram panchayat governed two villages and was based at Baur.

Demographics
At the 2011 census, the village comprised 304 households. The population of 1549 was split between 794 males and 755 females.

See also
List of villages in Mawal taluka

References

Villages in Mawal taluka